Juice TV, previously Juice, originally was a 24-hour music television channel operating from the Auckland suburb of Parnell in New Zealand. The channel closed on 15 May 2015 and relaunched as a 30-minute-long programme on Garage. The channel then relaunched independently from Garage on Freeview and its own online broadcast.

History

Juice originally launched as Juice TV on the Sky Orange channel which aired on Sky's UHF pay TV service, starting in 1994. In 1997, the channel began broadcasting 24 hours a day. In 1998 Juice TV began broadcasting exclusively on Sky Digital.

Hosts have included Clare and Andy P (7–9pm weekdays), Virg le Brun (4–7pm weekdays), Haimona Ngata (12–2pm weekdays), Geoffrey Bell (7pm weekdays), Justin Brown, Glenn Paul, Bruce Earwaker, Amber, and Dayna Vawdrey.  The station used an automated Omneon Spectrum media server playout system to operate 24 hours a day and was funded by advertising paying no access fees for carriage on SKY's platform. Juice TV was the only station to broadcast in the 16:9 aspect ratio in New Zealand until January 2011. From 2001 to 2011, Juice TV held an annual music video awards ceremony, the Juice TV Awards. In 2011, Juice TV ceased broadcasting on the analogue platform. In November 2014, Juice TV rebranded to Juice with a new logo. On 15 May 2015 Juice was replaced by Garage TV, an action and adventure channel, which retained a Juice-branded programme as a half-hour presentation. Garage TV itself ceased over-the-air operations 31 July 2017 to become a streaming service.

In 2020, Juice TV was resurrected as the music brand on Kordia TV, Kordia's local channel on Freeview.

Shows

NZOWN: A weekly music review show featuring the latest happenings in New Zealand's music scene.
Discover.New.Music: A music video show featuring up and coming new artists and music videos. 
The Line Up: The hottest music video chart in NZ; as chosen by viewers.
The Squeeze: A weekly video game review show. 
The Metal Bar: Heavy-Metal based music show music videos, news and gossip hosted by Riccardo.
ZM on Juice: Local radio show ZM features on Juice. 
Transmission: Alternative music show.
Girl & Boy: Clare & Andy P presenting weeknights; a Top 10 music video focus with humour, general banter and audience interaction.

See also
 Juice TV Awards

Suggested reading
 Philpott, Emma "Motivating The Video Makers", NZ Musician (Vol: 10, No: 8),  Auckland, April/May 2003

External links
 Official Site
 Juice TV Facebook

Defunct television channels in New Zealand
Music television channels
Music organisations based in New Zealand